This is a list of diplomatic missions of South Sudan.

Africa

 Kinshasa (Embassy)

 Cairo (Embassy)

 Asmara (Embassy)

 Addis Ababa (Embassy)

 Nairobi (Embassy)

 Abuja (Embassy)

 Pretoria (Embassy)

 Khartoum (Embassy)

 Dar es Salaam (Embassy)

 Kampala (Embassy)

 Harare (Embassy)

Americas

 Washington, D.C. (Embassy)
 New York City (Permanent Mission to the )

Asia

 Beijing (Embassy)

New Delhi  (Embassy)

Tel Aviv (Embassy)

Tokyo (Embassy)

Kuwait City (Embassy) 

Doha (Embassy)

Ankara (Embassy)

Europe

 Brussels (Embassy to Belgium and the )

 Paris (Embassy)

 Berlin (Embassy)

 Rome (Embassy)

 Oslo (Embassy)

 Moscow (Embassy)

 Geneva (Embassy and Mission to the UN)

 London (Embassy)

Gallery

See also
 Foreign relations of South Sudan
 List of diplomatic missions in South Sudan

References

 
South Sudan
Diplomatic missions